The Chaffee Art Center for the Visual Arts is a non profit art center located in Rutland, Vermont. Operated by the Rutland Area Arts Association, the center's exhibit gallery usually displays artwork made by artists that reside in the Rutland County area.

The Center offers visual art classes for children and adults.

History
The Center was founded in 1961 by the Rutland Area Arts Association. It is located in the 1896 George Chaffee House, a Queen Anne Victorian mansion called “Sunny Gables”.

References

External links
Official web site

Arts centers in Vermont
Buildings and structures in Rutland, Vermont
Tourist attractions in Rutland County, Vermont
1961 establishments in Vermont